The play-offs of the 2008 Fed Cup Europe/Africa Zone Group I were the final stages of the Group I zonal competition involving teams from Europe and Africa. Using the positions determined in their pools, the sixteen teams faced off to determine their placing in the 2008 Fed Cup Europe/Africa Zone Group I. The top two teams advanced to World Group II Play-offs, and the bottom two teams were relegated down to the Europe/Africa Zone Group II for the next year.

Promotional play-offs 
The first placed teams of each pool were placed against each other in two head-to-head rounds. The winner of the rounds advanced to the World Group II Play-offs, where they would get a chance to advance to the World Group II for next year.

Netherlands vs. Serbia

Switzerland vs. Sweden

Fifth to seventh play-off 
The second placed teams of each pool were placed against each other in two ties. The winner of each tie was allocated fifth place in the Group while the losers were allocated seventh.

Bulgaria vs. Hungary

Belarus vs. Romania

Ninth 
Due to the fact that there were an odd number of teams in Pool D (three), as opposed to the four teams in the other pools, all the teams that placed third in the pools with four teams (and ) were allocated ninth place.

Relegation play-offs 
The last placed teams of each pool were placed against each other in two ties. The losing team of the rounds were relegated to Group II for next year.

Portugal vs. Great Britain

Georgia vs. Poland

Final placements 

  and  advanced to the World Group II Play-offs. The Serbians were drawn against , and they won 3–2, which thus caused them to advance to 2009 World Group II. The Swiss, however, were drawn against , and they also lost 2–3. They thus were relegated back to Group I.
They both placed second in their respective pools, and thus advanced to the play-offs. The Portuguese won their tie, and thus advanced back to Group I, while the Georgians lost theirs and therefore remained in Group II for 2010.

References

External links 
 Fed Cup website

2008 Fed Cup Europe/Africa Zone